The Milky Way is a one-reel animated cartoon short subject, produced in Technicolor and released to theatres with the film The Captain Is a Lady in 1940 by Metro-Goldwyn-Mayer. The short (produced and directed by Rudolf Ising and co-produced by Fred Quimby with the voice of Bernice Hansen as the kittens and their mother, and musical supervision by Scott Bradley) explores the adventures of the "three little kittens who lost their mittens", as they explore a dreamland where space is made up entirely of dairy products (for example, the Milky Way is made of milk and the Moon is made of green cheese). The short won the 1940 Oscar for Best Animated Short Film, and was the first non-Disney film to do so. Other shorts nominated in 1940 included A Wild Hare by Warner Bros., introducing Bugs Bunny, and another MGM cartoon Puss Gets the Boot, with Jasper & Jinx, the prototype for Tom and Jerry. This makes 1940 the first time a Disney film wasn’t even nominated for the award.  It was added as a bonus feature in the Marx Bros. DVD release of Go West (1940) and Warner Archive Blu-ray release of Broadway Melody of 1940 (1940).

Plot
Three kittens, denied milk as punishment for losing their mittens after playing out in the snow, sail up into the Milky Way in a basket lifted by three helium balloons. Their space flight takes them past the Moon, the planet Mars, the Big Dipper, and the Little Dipper, until they reach their destination: the Milky Way.

Once in the Milky Way, they find it a land of natural milk springs and gushers. The kittens proceed to happily gorge themselves on milk, until they get into trouble and risk falling back down to Earth. However, it is then revealed that the whole event was just a fabric of their imaginations. Their mother then comes in to their bedroom to invite them down for supper. The kittens rush excitedly into the kitchen, only to be sickened to see that their supper is milk.

Additional Crew
 Production Manager: Fred Quimby
 Film Co-Produced by William Hanna (uncredited)
 Uncredited Story by Maurice Day
 Uncredited Animation by Jack Zander

Home Media
Go West (unrestored bonus feature)
Warner Bros. Home Entertainment Academy Awards Animation Collection: 15 Winners (restored)
Warner Bros. Home Entertainment Academy Awards Animation Collection, Disc 1 (restored)
 Broadway Melody of 1940, Warner Archive Collection Blu-ray release (restored bonus feature)

References

External links
 The Milky Way (1940) on Dailymotion (uploaded by InternetAnimationDatabase)
 

1940 films
1940 animated films
1940 short films
1940s American animated films
1940s animated short films
1940s fantasy comedy films
1940 musical comedy films
American musical comedy films
Best Animated Short Academy Award winners
Films directed by Rudolf Ising
Metro-Goldwyn-Mayer animated short films
1940s musical fantasy films
Films based on nursery rhymes
Animated films about cats
Films about dreams
American musical fantasy films
Films produced by Fred Quimby
Films scored by Scott Bradley
Milky Way in fiction
Mars in film
Moon in film
Films set on balloons
Spaceflight in fiction
Metro-Goldwyn-Mayer cartoon studio short films
1940s English-language films